David Kaiser is an American physicist and historian of science at the Massachusetts Institute of Technology

David Kaiser may also refer to: 

 David E. Kaiser (born 1947), American historian, formerly on the faculty of the Naval War College
 David Kaiser (philanthropist) (1969–2020), American philanthropist and activist, president of the Rockefeller Family Fund